MOV may refer to:

 MOV (x86 instruction), a mnemonic for the copying of data from one location to another in the x86 assembly language
 .mov, filename extension for the QuickTime multimedia file format
 Metal oxide varistor, an electronic component with a significant non-ohmic current-voltage characteristic
 Marconi-Osram Valve, a former British manufacturer of vacuum tubes
 The Merchant of Venice, a play by William Shakespeare
 MOV (TV channel), a Portuguese television channel operated by ZON Multimédia
 Member of the Order of the Volta, one of the highest national awards of Ghana
 MOV (album), a 1999 album by R&B group Men of Vizion
 Motor-operated valve, a style of valve actuator for controlling flow in pipes
 MOV, an abbreviation of mother of vinegar, the colony of yeast and bacteria in a bottle of vinegar
 Moranbah Airport, IATA airport code "MOV"
 Moshassuck Valley Railroad, reporting mark MOV